Francis Lee (born 1969) is an English filmmaker who has written and directed the films God's Own Country (2017) and Ammonite (2020).

Life and career 
Francis Lee grew up on his family's farm in Soyland, Calderdale, West Yorkshire. After finishing school, he studied acting at the Rose Bruford College and worked in the theatre afterwards. Lee first appeared on television in 1994 in Peak Practice, which was followed by guest roles in television series like Midsomer Murders, Heartbeat and Casualty. In cinema, he had small roles in Mike Leigh's Topsy-Turvy (1999) and in Sandra Goldbacher's Me Without You (2001).

Although working as a director today, he never trained at a film school. In the 2000s, Lee lost interest in acting and wanted to tell his own stories. While working at a scrapyard, he made his directing debut with the short film The Farmer's Wife (2012), followed by the short films Bradford Halifax London (2013) and The Last Smallholder (2014). He had his breakthrough with the 2017 film God's Own Country, which received critical acclaim. He won prizes at the Sundance Film Festival and the Teddy Awards, the Breakthrough director award at the London Film Critics' Circle and the BAFTA Award for Best Debut Screenwriter.

Lee directed Ammonite, which was released in September 2020 and stars Kate Winslet and Saoirse Ronan as a lesbian couple in the 19th century.

He is working on an upcoming horror film that explores themes of "class and queerness".

He divides his time between Yorkshire and London.

Filmography

References

External links 
 
 Interview with Francis Lee at Film-Inquiry

1969 births
Living people
English film directors
20th-century English male actors
English LGBT writers
English gay actors
LGBT film directors
20th-century English LGBT people
21st-century English LGBT people
People from Calderdale (district)